Robert Chwastek  (born 11 September 1988 in Chorzów) is a Polish footballer who plays as a midfielder for Drama Zbrosławice.

External links
 

1988 births
Living people
Wisła Płock players
GKS Bełchatów players
Ząbkovia Ząbki players
Ruch Chorzów players
Siarka Tarnobrzeg players
Gryf Wejherowo players
Polonia Bytom players
Ekstraklasa players
III liga players
II liga players
I liga players
Polish footballers
Sportspeople from Chorzów
Association football midfielders